Ranoidea elkeae is a species of frog in the subfamily Pelodryadinae. It is endemic to West Papua, Indonesia. Its natural habitats are subtropical or tropical moist lowland forests, swamps, freshwater marshes, intermittent freshwater marshes, and heavily degraded former forest.

Sources
 

elkeae
Amphibians of Western New Guinea
Amphibians described in 2000
Taxonomy articles created by Polbot
Taxobox binomials not recognized by IUCN